Mary E. Berkheiser is an American lawyer, currently the Joyce Mack Professor of Law at William S. Boyd School of Law, University of Nevada, Las Vegas.

References

Year of birth missing (living people)
Living people
University of Nevada, Las Vegas faculty
American lawyers
University of Arizona alumni